Marve is a surname. Notable people with the surname include:

Chris Marve (born 1989), American football player and coach
Eugene Marve (1960–2021), American football player
Robert Marve (born 1989), American football player, son of Eugene